Anna Smoleńska (February 28, 1920 in Warsaw – March 19, 1943 in Auschwitz-Birkenau), pseudonym "Hania", Polish student of art history at the University of Warsaw, author of the symbol of Fighting Poland during World War II, girl scout Gray Ranks.

Life
The Smoleński family lived in the so-called House of Professors, which is part of the University of Technology's building complex at Koszykowa street 75.

In 1938 she graduated from the Juliusz Słowacki Junior High School in Warsaw. She began studying art history at the Faculty of Humanities at the University of Warsaw. During the German occupation, she studied at the Municipal Horticultural and Agricultural School at Opaczewska Street in Warsaw, where secret education was conducted in Polish. She completed a conspiracy communications course, and was a participant in the "Wawer" Minor sabotage. She looked after the families of the arrested and provided them with secret messages from Nazi Pawiak prison. She belonged to "Kuźnica Harcerska".

In 1942 she was a liaison at the Propaganda Department of the Bureau of Information and Propaganda ("BIP") of the General Headquarters of the Union of Armed Struggle - the Home Army ("ZWZ-AK"). In 1942 she won the competition of the Bureau of Information and Propaganda for the sign of the Polish Underground State - anchor project - the symbol of Fighting Poland.

Arrest
She was the liaison of Maria Straszewska, the editorial secretary of the "Information Bulletin" (in Polish: "Biuletyn Informacyjny"). The Germans tried to arrest the editor-in-chief of the "Information Bulletin" Aleksander Kamiński and the editorial secretary Maria Straszewska, but failed. However, on November 3, 1942, the Gestapo arrested Anna Smoleńska, her parents, sister and brother with his wife.

Death at Auschwitz
After being imprisoned in Pawiak, she did not give anyone away, despite the heavy investigation. Smoleńska was later taken from Pawiak on November 26, 1942, to Auschwitz concentration camp, where she was given camp number 26008. She died of typhus, and three of her family members were killed in Auschwitz. Her father, after a hard investigation, was shot by the Gestapo in the ruins of the ghetto on May 7, 1943.

Commemoration
In 1998, a commemorative plaque was unveiled, dedicated to the scouts: Anna Smoleńska and Tadeusz Zawadzki. The plaque was placed on the side wall of the "House of Professors" of the Warsaw University of Technology at Koszykowa 75 street in Warsaw.

See also 

 Anna Maria Hinel
 Krystyna Krahelska
 Jan Bytnar
 Maciej Aleksy Dawidowski
 Andrzej Romocki
 Jan Rodowicz
 Krzysztof Kamil Baczyński
 Józef Szczepański
 Tadeusz Zawadzki
 Sonderaktion Krakau
 German AB-Aktion in Poland
 Intelligenzaktion
 List of Poles
 Nazi crimes against the Polish nation
 Wola massacre
 Wawer massacre
 War crimes in occupied Poland during World War II
 World War II casualties of Poland

References

Bibliography
 , pp. 257–258.

External links 

 
 
 

Auschwitz concentration camp prisoners
Polish people who died in Auschwitz concentration camp
Polish women in World War II resistance
1920 births
1943 deaths
Home Army members
Polish civilians killed in World War II
Polish Scouts and Guides
People from Warsaw
Women in World War II